Plaza Alta may refer to:

Plaza Alta (Algeciras), Andalucía, Spain
Plaza Alta (Badajoz), Extremadura, Spain
Alta Plaza, San Francisco